The roads in Memphis, Tennessee, include Interstate 40 (I-40), I-55, I-69, and I-240 with interchanges near the city center, and I-269 with interchanges serving the eastern outskirts. There are eight U.S. Highways serving the city. One beltway surrounds Memphis within the city, plus an additional semi-beltway surrounds the outer reaches of the city.

Interstates

Additionally, I-22, which travels concurrently with U.S. Route 78, also serves the area as a connecting freeway from the Memphis area to Birmingham, Alabama. I-22's western terminus is currently located at the I-269 junction near Byhalia, Mississippi.

U.S. Highways

State routes

Other notable roadways 
Sam Cooper Boulevard

Notes

See also 

Transportation in Memphis, Tennessee
Tennessee Department of Transportation 
List of numbered highways in Tennessee
List of state routes in Tennessee

References 

Memphis
Transportation in Shelby County, Tennessee
 
Tennessee transportation-related lists